Howard Pursuivant of Arms Extraordinary is an officer of arms extraordinary in England; that is, a royal herald but not a member of the College of Arms in London.  

The present office was created in November 1992 by the Earl Marshal, and named from the barony of Howard of Glossop (created in 1869), to which Miles Fitzalan-Howard succeeded in 1972 before succeeding as Earl Marshal and Duke of Norfolk in 1975. The Duke himself had never used the Glossop title, since his mother's barony of Beaumont takes precedence.

The badge of office was assigned in 1992: A cross-crosslet fitchy argent enclosed within a pair of wings displayed and reflexed gold. The crosslet is taken from the Howard's Arms and crest, while the wings allude to one of the Howard's crests and also the swiftness of the pursuivant as a messenger.

There has only been one appointment to this office since its creation.

Holders of the office

See also
 Heraldry
 Officer of Arms

References
Citations

Bibliography
 The College of Arms, Queen Victoria Street : being the sixteenth and final monograph of the London Survey Committee, Walter H. Godfrey, assisted by Sir Anthony Wagner, with a complete list of the officers of arms, prepared by H. Stanford London, (London, 1963)
 A History of the College of Arms &c, Mark Noble, (London, 1804)

External links
The College of Arms
CUHGS Officer of Arms Index

English offices of arms